Adnan Januzaj (born 5 February 1995) is a Belgian professional footballer who plays as a winger for Süper Lig club İstanbul Başakşehir, on loan from La Liga club Sevilla, and the Belgium national team.

Born and raised in Brussels, he began his career with Anderlecht before joining Manchester United in 2011 at the age of 16. Januzaj broke into the Manchester United first-team under manager David Moyes during the 2013–14 season, but struggled for opportunities under Moyes' successors Louis van Gaal and José Mourinho, and had loan spells at Borussia Dortmund and Sunderland before joining Real Sociedad in July 2017.

Januzaj made his full international debut in 2014 and later that year played for Belgium at the FIFA World Cup in 2014 and 2018, reaching the semi-finals of the latter tournament.

Club career

Manchester United

Januzaj began his football career with FC Brussels but joined Anderlecht as a 10-year-old in 2005. He left Anderlecht for Manchester United at the age of 16 in March 2011, after impressing in a skills session in Brussels.

Towards the end of the 2012–13 season, United manager Sir Alex Ferguson promoted Januzaj to the first-team and he was registered with the number 44 jersey; he did not feature in the remainder of the season, but he was an unused substitute in the final game of the season away to West Bromwich Albion. For his performances during the season, Januzaj won the 2013 Denzil Haroun Reserve Team Player of the Year award. He was included in the first-team squad for the 2013–14 pre-season tour of Asia and scored in the final game of the tour against Hong Kong side Kitchee five minutes after being substituted on. He also started in Rio Ferdinand's testimonial; United lost 3–1 to Sevilla, but Januzaj provided the assist for United's only goal.

2013–14 season
Januzaj made his competitive debut for Manchester United against Wigan Athletic on 11 August 2013 in the Community Shield, coming on for Robin van Persie with six minutes left to play. He made his Premier League debut a month later, coming on as a 68th-minute substitute for Ashley Young in a 2–0 home win over Crystal Palace on 14 September. On 5 October 2013, in what was his first start for the club, Januzaj scored twice as United came from behind to claim a 2–1 victory away to Sunderland. In an effort to stave off interest from other clubs, who could have signed Januzaj for "minimal compensation" on the expiry of his existing contract in June 2014, Manchester United signed Januzaj to a new five-year contract on 19 October 2013. On 3 December 2013, he was nominated for the BBC Young Sports Personality of the Year; at the time of his nomination, he had played in ten games for Manchester United.

Januzaj was left out of Manchester United's initial squad for the UEFA Champions League when it was registered in September 2013, which came as a surprise to some members of the media after his impressive start to the season. Manager David Moyes later explained this was a tactical decision to allow the club to register an additional player for the competition; as Januzaj had not been with the club long enough to be eligible for the 'List B' squad, which for 2013–14 included any player born after 1 January 1992 who had been eligible to play for the club for at least two years, he would have had to be registered as one of only 25 'List A' players, taking up a space that could have been used by another player. By waiting until 7 October 2013 to register Januzaj, he became eligible as a List B player, but this meant that he could not be selected for the club's first two matches in the competition, at home to Bayer Leverkusen and away to Shakhtar Donetsk. Despite being available from the third game of the tournament, at home to Real Sociedad, Januzaj was left out of both games against the Spanish club and the return match against Bayer Leverkusen. He made his Champions League debut at home to Shakhtar Donetsk on 10 December 2013.

Towards the end of the first half of the 2013–14 season, Januzaj gathered somewhat of a reputation for diving, beginning with a yellow card for a "clear dive" on his full debut against Sunderland in October 2013. He received another booking for simulation against West Ham United in December 2013, going to ground despite West Ham defender James Collins not offering a challenge. His third yellow card – which made him the joint second-most-booked player in the Premier League since sanctions for diving were introduced in 2008 – came against Tottenham Hotspur on 1 January 2014 and was the most contentious of the three; although Januzaj went to ground "easily" under a challenge from Tottenham defender Danny Rose, others were of the opinion that Rose "made no attempt to win the ball" and that Januzaj should not have been booked. David Moyes admitted speaking to Januzaj about simulation, but repeatedly requested that match officials protect the winger from overzealous tackling by opposition defenders.

2014–15 season

At the start of the 2014–15 season, Januzaj was allocated the number 11 shirt, previously worn by the recently retired Ryan Giggs. He made his first appearance of the season as a substitute in United's opening Premier League match; a 1–2 loss at home to Swansea City. His first start of the season came in a 2–2 draw with West Bromwich Albion on 20 October 2014, in which he struggled against physical defenders Sébastien Pocognoli and Joleon Lescott.

2015–16 season
After not scoring in any competitions the previous season, and not making the bench for the first game of the new campaign, Januzaj scored his first goal for over a year on 14 August 2015, a close range 29th-minute strike which gave United victory at Aston Villa. His first appearance upon return from loan came against Southampton on 23 January 2016, when he replaced Cameron Borthwick-Jackson as a late substitute.

Loan to Borussia Dortmund
On 31 August 2015, Januzaj was loaned to German club Borussia Dortmund on a season-long deal. On 6 January 2016, he was recalled to United after only playing in 12 games for Dortmund in the first half of the season, starting three times.

Loan to Sunderland
On 12 August 2016, Januzaj agreed to join Sunderland on a season-long loan move from Manchester United, linking up with former Manchester United manager David Moyes. Januzaj made his debut the following day, coming off the bench against Manchester City in a 2–1 defeat on the opening weekend of the Premier League season. In his third game for Sunderland against Shrewsbury Town, Januzaj scored his first goal for the team, a late winner. Januzaj was sent off for two yellow cards on 18 September in a 1–0 loss at Tottenham. Six days later, he suffered an ankle injury that ruled him out for at least six weeks during the 3–2 defeat to Crystal Palace. In December, Moyes said that despite Januzaj's talent, he needed to improve his performances at Sunderland if he wanted to break into Manchester United's squad.

Real Sociedad
Having failed to hold onto his place in the Manchester United squad, Januzaj signed a five-year contract with Spanish club Real Sociedad in July 2017. He made his debut in La Liga on 10 September, starting in a 4–2 win at Deportivo de La Coruña, and scored his first goal on 5 November in a 3–1 home victory against Basque neighbours SD Eibar. He also scored in a draw with UD Las Palmas and was one of three nominees for La Liga Player of the Month. He also scored a late equaliser against Atletico Madrid that proved vital to secure his team a European place.

Sevilla
After being released by Real Sociedad at the end of the 2021–22 season, Januzaj signed a four-year contract with Sevilla on 31 August 2022.

Loan to İstanbul Başakşehir
On 3 February 2023, Januzaj signed for Süper Lig club İstanbul Başakşehir on loan until the end of the season.

International career
Due to his Kosovan-Albanian parents and his Turkish grandparents, in 2013, media reported that Januzaj was eligible to represent several national teams - Belgium (through being born there and having a Belgian passport), Albania (through his Albanian descent) and Kosovo (which was not a FIFA member at that time and only a partially recognized independent state), as well as Serbia, Turkey and Croatia. About this case, Abedin Januzaj (Adnan's father) stated "I am not closing the doors to Albania, because we are Albanian. However, they are closing the doors to themselves. I only deal with professionals on the issue," and said that Adnan would not represent Serbia, Turkey or Croatia because "we have no connections with these countries".

In October 2013, England manager Roy Hodgson stated that The Football Association was monitoring the player with a view to calling him up if Januzaj was naturalized as a British citizen (and passed the residency requirement of FIFA, according to David Moyes). However, despite widespread press coverage, Januzaj did not meet the requirements to play for England under the rules set out in the Home Nations agreement,  which requires that players engage in a minimum of five years of education before the age of 18 within the territory of the relevant association and national team eligibility through residency as an adult is not applicable.

Despite having played competitively for Belgium at senior level, Januzaj remained eligible to represent Kosovo, as it was not a UEFA or FIFA member when he made his Belgian debut. However, once he made another appearance with Belgium after 2016 (the year in which Kosovo became a member of FIFA), Januzaj became ineligible to represent Kosovo and could from then on represent Belgium only.

Belgium
In June 2013, the former coach of the Belgian under-18 and under-19 teams, Marc Van Geersom, declared that Januzaj had refused a call-up to the Belgian team a number of times, since he would prefer to play for Albania.

On 7 October 2013, former national team coach Marc Wilmots attempted to select Januzaj for the 2014 FIFA World Cup qualifying games against Croatia and Wales, but Januzaj refused the call-up, saying he still needs to make a choice. In response, Wilmots stated: "I wanted to send him a clear signal. Just as Zakaria Bakkali, Adnan is a very promising youngster and I would like to integrate him into the group. I do not want to force his hand. I respect his choice and consider discussing with Adnan and his family". On 16 October, discussing rumours that suggested Januzaj would choose to represent Belgium if he is included in the 2014 FIFA World Cup squad, Wilmots declared: "The boy was born in Belgium, should he say that he wants to play for Belgium – from there, there is no haggling. I'm not going to play that game. If you're at the top level in Manchester or elsewhere, show me your skills and if I need you I will call. I make no promises, to Januzaj or any person". The following day, Januzaj's father told Kosovar TV station KTV that he did not like the Belgian federation's approach: "I am not blackmailing them as I'm not asking for any national team to get my son. It is them who want Adnan. [...] you have to be professional in this issue. Belgium should follow the rules as well. I run his career in a sportive sense, and I have Belgium managers running the legal issues."

On 23 April 2014, Wilmots announced that Januzaj had committed himself to the Belgium national team. This message was confirmed the day itself by Januzaj's manager Dirk De Vriese. On 13 May 2014, Januzaj was included in Belgium's 23-man squad for the 2014 FIFA World Cup. He played a first game with the national team two weeks later in a match against Luxembourg, but he did not earn his first cap; the match was considered unofficial by FIFA on 4 June because Belgian coach Wilmots made 7 substitutions while only 6 are allowed in international friendlies. His official debut came in the next warm-up game, a 1–0 win over Tunisia on 7 June, replacing Eden Hazard after 73 minutes.

In November 2017, Januzaj was recalled to the Belgian squad for the first time in three years ahead of friendlies against Mexico and Japan, but did not play. In June, he was named by Roberto Martínez in the 23-man squad for the 2018 FIFA World Cup in Russia. In the final group game against England in Kaliningrad, he scored the only goal as the Belgians advanced as group winners.

Sponsorship
In 2014, New Balance announced that they were taking over Warrior Sports, and they would be intent on making their own football boots. They recruited many professional footballers, including Januzaj, who also featured in an advertisement promoting the new range.

Career statistics

Club

International

Honours
Manchester United
FA Community Shield: 2013

Real Sociedad
 Copa del Rey: 2019–20

Belgium
FIFA World Cup third place: 2018

Individual
Denzil Haroun Reserve Player of the Year: 2012–13
Blue Stars/FIFA Youth Cup Golden Ball: 2013

References

External links

 
 
 
 
 Real Sociedad official profile 
 Profile at ManUtd.com
 Profile at StretfordEnd.co.uk

1995 births
Living people
Belgian people of Albanian descent
Belgian people of Kosovan descent
Belgian people of Turkish descent
Footballers from Brussels
Belgian footballers
Association football wingers
Manchester United F.C. players
Borussia Dortmund players
Sunderland A.F.C. players
Real Sociedad footballers
Sevilla FC players
İstanbul Başakşehir F.K. players
Premier League players
Bundesliga players
La Liga players
Süper Lig players
Belgium international footballers
2014 FIFA World Cup players
2018 FIFA World Cup players
Belgian expatriate footballers
Belgian expatriate sportspeople in England
Belgian expatriate sportspeople in Germany
Belgian expatriate sportspeople in Spain
Belgian expatriate sportspeople in Turkey
Expatriate footballers in England
Expatriate footballers in Germany
Expatriate footballers in Spain
Expatriate footballers in Turkey